The Adair County News was a weekly newspaper published on Wednesdays, in Columbia, Adair County, Kentucky  The Adair County News was first published in 1887, and was last published in 1987.

History

Beginning
The Adair County News was founded by Charles S. Harris in 1887 as a Democratic alternative to Alvin A. Strange's Republican Columbia Spectator, in its first issue it was stated that the purpose of the News was that it was to serve as "a true Democratic paper, come to advocate honest convictions and defend noble principles."

References 

Adair County, Kentucky
Defunct newspapers published in Kentucky
Defunct weekly newspapers
Publications established in 1887
Publications disestablished in 1987
1887 establishments in Kentucky
1987 disestablishments in Kentucky